Hartlaub's bustard (Lissotis hartlaubii) is a species of bird in the family Otididae. It is found in open grassland with grass up to 1800 meters in Ethiopia, Kenya, Somalia, Sudan, Tanzania, and Uganda.

The common name and Latin binomial commemorate the German physician and ornithologist Gustav Hartlaub.

Description 
At , they are larger than the similar Black-bellied bustard but greyer and more clearly marked in face, and the lower back with blackish tail. They have a small head set on a long neck, and a bulky body with large legs. The female is similar in appearance to the male, but with a cream-coloured head and hind neck with dark brown markings, a whitish belly and paler tail.

Breeding 
The breed usually in rainy periods however it depends on the geography of the place . In Ethiopia, Hartlaub's bustard breed in April and in eats Africa. they breed around January to June. however the aerial display of breeding is recorded in November.

 It is not globally threatened (Least Concern) species of birds according to CITES II. However the size of the global population is still unknown as they are very rare and is mainly found at local ranges of Africa.

Habitat 
Hartlaub's bustard are associated with lightly wooded grasslands containing Acacia trees, up to 2000 metres above sea level.

References

Lissotis
Birds of East Africa
Birds described in 1863
Taxa named by Theodor von Heuglin
Taxonomy articles created by Polbot